CEU may refer to:

Education
Central European University in Vienna, Austria and Budapest, Hungary
College of Eastern Utah, in Price, UT, USA
Centro Escolar University, in Manila, Philippines
Centro de Estudios Universitarios, Catholic educational foundation in Spain
Continuing Education Units, professional development credits in the United States

Others
Céu (born 1980), Brazilian indie singer-songwriter
Constructional Engineering Union, former UK Trade Union merged into AEEU

See also
CEUS (disambiguation)